Events in the year 2022 in Eswatini

Incumbents 

 Monarch (Ngwenyama): Mswati III
 Prime Minister: Cleopas Dlamini

Events 

Ongoing — COVID-19 pandemic in Eswatini, 2021-2022 Eswatini protests

 23 August – Three new Cyber laws come into effect; the Computer Crime and Cyber Crime Act, 2022, the Data Protection Act, 2022, and the Electronic Communications and Transactions Act, 2022.
 4 September – King Mswati III is accused of delaying national dialogue in regards to the anti-monarchy protests.

References 

 
2020s in Eswatini
Years of the 21st century in Eswatini
Eswatini
Eswatini